The Miss Hong Kong 2012 pageant was held in the TVB City on August 26, 2012. Ten delegates completed for the title; the winner was Carat Cheung.

Results

Placements

Special awards

Contestant list

Post-Pageant Notes
 Carat Cheung placed 2nd runner-up in Miss Chinese International Pageant 2013 in Hong Kong.
 Jacqueline Wong unplaced in Miss World 2013 in Bali, Indonesia. She replaced Carat Cheung, Miss Hong Kong 2012, as Cheung could not compete due to being over-age.
 Tracy Chu unplaced in Miss International 2012 in Okinawa, Japan.

References

Miss Hong Kong Pageants